The following are lists of people who play men's football (soccer). For people who play women's football (soccer), see Lists of women's association football players.

Other lists of players 
 List of footballers with 100 or more caps
 List of top international men's association football goal scorers by country
 List of foreign Bundesliga players
 List of foreign football players in the Netherlands
 List of foreign Premier League players
 List of foreign Primeira Liga players
 List of foreign La Liga players
 List of foreign Liga MX players
 List of foreign Ligue 1 players
 List of foreign MLS players
 List of foreign footballers in the Persian Gulf Pro League
 List of foreign Serie A players
 List of foreign footballers in Japan
 Retired numbers in association football
 List of Premier League winning players
 List of association football families
 Dual Irish international footballers
 List of goalscoring goalkeepers
 List of association footballers who died while playing

See also 
 List of people by occupation
 List of American football players
 List of Australian Rules footballers
 List of footballers (Gaelic football)
 List of association football competitions